Jamila Omar Bouamout, better known as Laila Ghofran (alt Laila Ghofrane, Layla Ghofran; born March 19, 1961) is a Moroccan singer and holds Egyptian citizenship.

Ghofran rose to stardom thanks to her strong, unique voice. She started her singing career in the mid-1980s and her songs were popular. She is called the "Sultana of Tarab".

Career 
Ghofran's career began in the 1980s but really picked up between 1988 and 1998, elevating her to the status of Arab diva, in part due to the work of her husband and manager Ibrahim Aakad. She released her first album “Oyounak Amari” in 1989. She broke through with the song “Bahibak, Bahibak” in 1992.

Ghofran found her way to audiences with her very successful remakes of songs of the legendary Egyptian singer Abdelhalim Hafez in 1996. Her performances  of “Gabbar”, “Kamel El Awsaf” and “Hobbak Nar” remain widely appreciated.

Her greatest hits include “Law Hata Hayerfodny El Alam”, “Bahibak, Bahibak”, “Es’alou Eddourouf”, “Asahelhalak”, "El Garh Men Naseebi" among others.

Personal life 
Ghofran has been married six times and is the mother of two daughters.

Her daughter, Hiba, was murdered in 2008 along with her friend. In June 2010, Mahmoud Essawy was sentenced to death for the double-murder case.

Discography

Studio albums 
 Oyounak Amary (1989)
 Ya Farha Helly (1990)
 Ana Asfa (1991)
 Esaalo El Zorouf (1992)
 Kol Shea Momken (1993)
 Haza Ekhtiary (1994)
 Jabar (1996)
 Malameh (1997)
 Saat Al Zaman (1999)
 Ahow Da El Kalam (2003)
 Aktar Min Ay Waqt (2005)
 El Garh Men Naseebi (2009)
 Ahlamy (2013)

Compilation albums 
 Laila Ghofran (1990)

Non-album singles
 El Youm El Awel (1982)
 Raseef Omory (unknown date)
 Ya Beladi (1994)
 El Helm El Arabi (1996)
 Ya Rab (2000)
 Ya Hager (2001)
 Min Hena Wa Rayeh (2006)
 Heya Di Masr (2009)
 Qades Arwahom (2011)
 El Shabab Da (2011)
 Berahmetak Aweny (2011)
 Tahet El Hakayek (2013)
 Bilad El Aman (2015)
 Enta Maykhtlefsh Aleek Etneen (2016)
 Aiz Te'ol Haga (2016)
 Jabni El Gharam (2018)

References

1961 births
Living people
Moroccan pop singers
20th-century Moroccan women singers
20th-century Egyptian women singers
Naturalized citizens of Egypt
Singers who perform in Egyptian Arabic
Moroccan emigrants to Egypt
Rotana Records artists
21st-century Egyptian musicians
21st-century Egyptian women singers